WK, W.K., Wk, or Wk. can refer to one of the following:

Businesses and organizations:
 Wolters Kluwer, an information services company (EuroNext code WK)
 American Falcon (IATA airline code WK)
 Edelweiss Air (IATA airline code WK)
 Wikipedia, a collaborative online encyclopedia

Other uses:
 Week
 Wimpy Kid. US fictional character
 Western Kentucky Parkway, a former toll road in Kentucky, now a freeway; often locally called "the WK"
 Scaled Composites White Knight, a developmental aircraft
 WonderKing Online, a popular in-game abbreviation used also in forums
 Wrinkly Kong, an elderly Donkey Kong first seen in Donkey Kong Country. A video game character.
 Third generation Jeep Grand Cherokee, produced from 2005–2010